16 Avenue North is a planned and approved CTrain light rail station in Calgary, Alberta, Canada part of the Green Line. Construction is expected to begin in 2024 and complete in 2027 as part of construction stage one, phase two. The station serves as the northern terminus station for stage one of construction and is expected to be one of the busiest stations on opening day. It will serve as a transfer point between the Green Line and MAX Orange BRT, connecting riders to the city's northwest, northeast, the Southern Alberta Institute of Technology, the University of Calgary, the Foothills Medical Centre, the Alberta Children's Hospital and future Calgary Cancer Centre. 

The station will be directly south of 16 Avenue North in the community of Crescent Heights. It is planned to be a low-profile urban station with curb height platforms, at-grade boarding, and will be in the median of Centre Street. The station will not include a park and ride. The area surrounding the station is instead expected to be redeveloped with high-density transit oriented development. As of 2015, there were 6,250 residents and 3,250 jobs within walking distance of the station. That number is expected to increase to 13,400 residents and 5,050 jobs after the station opens for service in 2027. 

The station was planned as an underground station in the city's 2017 recommendations, but was modified to an at-grade station with the city's 2020 alignment update.

References 

CTrain stations
Railway stations scheduled to open in 2027